Zaleskie may refer to the following places:
Zaleskie, Białystok County in Podlaskie Voivodeship (north-east Poland)
Zaleskie, Sejny County in Podlaskie Voivodeship (north-east Poland)
Zaleskie, Pomeranian Voivodeship (north Poland)